This is a list of properties and districts in Coffee County, Georgia that are listed on the National Register of Historic Places (NRHP).

Current listings

|}

References

Coffee
Buildings and structures in Coffee County, Georgia